William Vermilye Brady (July 24, 1811– March 31, 1870) was the 68th mayor of New York City, in office from 1847 to 1848.

Biography
William V. Brady was born in New York City on July 24, 1811.  Before becoming active in politics, he was a silversmith and jeweler.

A fiscally conservative Whig, Brady entered politics as an opponent of the Tammany Hall Democratic organization.  From 1842 to 1847 he served as Assistant Alderman and then Alderman.

In 1847 he was a successful candidate for Mayor, capitalizing on a rift in Tammany and the third party candidacy of an anti-immigration nominee to score a narrow victory. He served until 1848.

For his support of Zachary Taylor's winning campaign for President in 1848, Brady was rewarded in 1849 with appointment as Postmaster of New York City. He served in this post until 1853.

After Franklin Pierce became President in 1853, Brady was replaced as Postmaster and went into the insurance business as a founder of the Continental Insurance Company in 1853, serving until 1857 as its first president.  He was also a member of the board of directors of the Mutual Life Insurance Company.  He was also a founder of the Widows and Orphans Benefit Life Insurance Company, of which he was president.

Brady died in New York City on March 31, 1870.  He was buried in Woodlawn Cemetery in The Bronx, New York City.

Legacy
Brady Avenue in the Bronx was named after him.

References

External links

William V. Brady at Political Graveyard
Historical Publishing Company, New York's Great Industries, 1885, page 62
John Daniel Crimmins, Irish-American Historical Miscellany, 1905, pages 377-378

Mayors of New York City
1811 births
1870 deaths
New York (state) Whigs
19th-century American politicians
Postmasters of New York City
American silversmiths
American jewellers
American businesspeople in insurance
Burials at Woodlawn Cemetery (Bronx, New York)
19th-century American businesspeople